The 2013–14 San Diego Toreros women's basketball team represented the University of San Diego in the 2013–14 college basketball season. The Toreros, members of the West Coast Conference, were led by head coach Cindy Fisher, in her 9th season at the school. The Toreros played their home games at the Jenny Craig Pavilion on the university campus in San Diego, California. The Toreros would finish tied for fourth in the conference and participate in the WNIT. The Toreros ended the season 24–9.

Roster

Schedule
Source:

|-
!colspan=9 style="background:#002654; color:#97CAFF;"| Non-conference Regular Season

|-
!colspan=9 style="background:#002654; color:#97CAFF;"| WCC Regular Season

|-
!colspan=9 style="background:#97CAFF; color:#002654;"| 2014 West Coast Conference women's basketball tournament

|-
!colspan=9 style="background:#97CAFF; color:#002654;"| 2014 WNIT

Game Summaries

Northern Colorado

Arizona State

San Diego State

San Jose State

Idaho

Hope International

Weber State

Cal State Fullerton

Seattle

Long Beach State

UC Irvine
Series History: San Diego leads 14–12

Pepperdine
Series History: Pepperdine leads 39–27

Loyola Marymount
Series History: San Diego leads 38–27

Saint Mary's
Series History: Saint Mary's leads 37–26

Pacific
Series History: San Diego leads 10–2

Portland
Series History: San Diego leads 32–31

Gonzaga
Series History: Gonzaga leads 45–20

BYU
Series History: BYU leads 6–0
Broadcasters: Justin Alderson and Tracy Warren

Santa Clara
Series History: Santa Clara leads 32–31

San Francisco
Series History: San Diego leads 35–24

Pacific
Series History: San Diego leads 11–2
Broadcasters: Don Gubbins and Alex Sanchez

Saint Mary's
Series History: Saint Mary's leads 37–27

San Francisco
Series History: San Diego leads 36–24

Santa Clara
Series History: Series even 32–32

Gonzaga
Series History: Gonzaga leads 46–20
Broadcasters: George Devine and Mary Hile-Nepfel

Portland
Series History: Series even 32–32

Loyola Marymount
Series History: San Diego leads 39–27

Pepperdine
Series History: Pepperdine leads 39–28
Broadcaster: Josh Perigo

BYU
Series History: BYU leads 6–1
Broadcasters: Spencer Linton and Kristen Kozlowski

WCC Quarterfinal: Saint Mary's
Series History: Saint Mary's leads 38–27
Broadcasters: Spencer Linton and Kristen Kozlowski

Rankings

References

San Diego
San Diego Toreros women's basketball seasons
2014 Women's National Invitation Tournament participants
San Diego Toreros
San Diego Toreros